Events in the year 1607 in Norway.

Incumbents
Monarch: Christian IV

Events
 A new Lutheran Church Ordinance is introduced in Norway.

Arts and literature

Births

Full date missing
Albert Andriessen Bradt, Norwegian-born settler in New Netherland (died 1686).

Deaths
25 January – Anders Foss, bishop (born 1543).
18 April – Anders Bendssøn Dall, Danish Lutheran prelate who served as Bishop of Oslo (born c.1550).

Full date missing
Anna Throndsen, noblewoman (born c.1540)

See also

References